Załęże  is a village in the administrative district of Gmina Osiek Jasielski, within Jasło County, Subcarpathian Voivodeship, in south-eastern Poland.

The village has an approximate population of 650.

References

Villages in Jasło County